Henry B. "Hank" Heller (August 14, 1941 – February 17, 2021) was an American politician from the state of Maryland. A Democrat, he represented District 19 in central Montgomery County in the Maryland House of Delegates from 1987 until 2011.

Background
Heller attended Walter Johnson High School in Montgomery County and received a B.A. from Frostburg State University and both an M.A. and Ed.D. from the Virginia Polytechnic Institute. He worked for the Montgomery County Public Schools in a number of capacities, and was a past president of the Montgomery County Education Association.

Legislative notes
 Voted against slots in 2005 (HB1361)
 Voted in favor of increasing the sales tax by 20% - Tax Reform Act of 2007(HB2)
 Voted in favor of in-state tuition for illegal immigrants in 2007 (HB6)
 Voted to ban first-cousin marriage in Maryland in 2000

Heller died on February 17, 2021, in Sandy Spring, Maryland at age 79.

External links

References

1941 births
2021 deaths
National Education Association people
People from Silver Spring, Maryland
Democratic Party members of the Maryland House of Delegates
Frostburg State University alumni
Virginia Tech alumni
20th-century American politicians
21st-century American politicians
Politicians from Washington, D.C.